Daku Aur Mahatma is a 1977 Bollywood action film directed by Ravigant Nagaich. The film was released under the banner of Radha Mohan Arts.

Plot

Cast
Rajendra Kumar as Laxman Singh / Dilawar Singh  
Reena Roy as Kiran 
Kabir Bedi as Sangram Singh
Yogeeta Bali as Vandana   
Raza Murad as Inspector Kailash Mathur
Mushtaq Merchant as Truck Cleaner                                                                                                                       
Mehmood Jr as Hamid                                                                                                                                           
Leena Das as Singer/Courtesan                                                                                                                         
Narendra Nath                                                                                                                                           
Kamal Kapoor

Soundtrack
The music of the film was composed by Ravindra Jain.

External links

References

1977 films
1970s Hindi-language films
Indian crime action films
Films scored by Ravindra Jain
1970s crime action films
Indian action films
Films directed by Ravikant Nagaich